Gignod is a town and comune in the Aosta Valley region of north-western Italy.

Twin towns — sister cities
Gignod is twinned with:

  Pontlevoy, France

Cities and towns in Aosta Valley